New Brunswick is one of Canada's provinces, and has established several provincial symbols.

Official Symbols

References

New Brunswick
Symbols
Canadian provincial and territorial symbols